The 2021 Manly-Warringah Sea Eagles Season was the 72nd in the clubs history since their entry into the then New South Wales Rugby League premiership in 1947. Des Hasler coached the team for the third consecutive year and eleventh overall at the club. Daly Cherry-Evans captained the club for the fifth consecutive year.

Brookvale Oval (4 Pines Park) upgrade and home ground capacity 
Construction started for a new 3,000-seat grandstand and a centre of excellence on the Northern Hill. The $33.1 million dollar project was to ensure that players and fans get access to better facilities than what the stadium currently provides. Due to that and limited capacity on the hill (due to COVID-19), there were only small crowds allowed in at home games. Grandstands were allowed at 100% on the final game before the games started to play behind closed doors.

Transfers 
Source:

2021 gains 
 Josh Aloiai from Wests Tigers
 Andrew Davey from Parramatta Eels
 Kieran Foran from Canterbury-Bankstown Bulldogs
 Christian Tuipulotu from Sydney Roosters
 Jason Saab from St. George Illawarra Dragons

2021 losses 
 Joel Thompson to St Helens R.F.C. (Super League)
 Corey Waddell to Canterbury-Bankstown Bulldogs
 Addin Fonua-Blake to New Zealand Warriors

Season summary

Horror start to the season 
Manly had one of their worst start to a season in club history, losing all of their first four games and at a combined score of 156-34. It got so bad that there were talks that coach Des Hasler may get sacked, however he was re-signed on a two year deal and was told he wouldn't be coaching in 2023 if the club didn't make the finals in 2021 or 22.  Captain Daly Cherry-Evans suitability for the role was also questioned. The club achieved their first win in round 5 of the season playing the New Zealand Warriors at Central Coast Stadium when Daly Cherry-Evans kicked a winning field goal to win 13-12. Despite the terrible start to the season it is worth noting that the four clubs that Manly lost to (Sydney Roosters, South Sydney Rabbitohs, St. George Illawarra Dragons and Penrith Panthers) all made up the top four after the first 5 rounds.

Turbo returns 
In Round 6 the club faced the Gold Coast Titans in what was expected by many people to be yet another hammering against the club. However with Tom Trbojevic returning to the side from his fourth hamstring injury in just two years, Manly played the reverse card winning 36-0 with Trbojevic being named man of the match after scoring a try, making 3 assists and being involved with a crucial pass to Cherry-Evans that led to the second try. 

Following that performance Trbojevic produced man of the match performances against the Wests Tigers, New Zealand Warriors, Brisbane Broncos and Parramatta Eels, only losing to the Penrith Panthers in that time frame in what was a much better performance than the first time they played. Manly ended the first half to the season with a poor (but controversial) loss to the Newcastle Knights.

Origin period 
After a bye, Manly thrashed the North Queensland Cowboys 50-18 without Trbojevic, with many players being the potential Man Of The Match, this match also was special as it was a game for Manly icon Bob Fulton, who had died a few weeks earlier (a moment of silence occurred before the match against the Parramatta Eels in Round 11 but this was the first home match since his death).

The following week, Manly produced one of the biggest comebacks in history against the Gold Coast Titans after being down 24-8, the team scored 48 unanswered points to win 56-24. 

The following week, Manly produced their biggest win in club history beating the Canterbury-Bankstown Bulldogs 66-0. 

The origin period rounded off with a 30-16 loss against the Canberra Raiders and a 32-18 win against the St. George Illawarra Dragons.

Run to the finals and records broken 
Manly started off their run to the finals with a 44-24 win against the Wests Tigers, a 40-22 win against the Cronulla-Sutherland Sharks and a 28-18 loss to the Melbourne Storm.

In Round 22, Manly beat the Parramatta Eels 56-10 in a very strong performance. Reuben Garrick also achieved a record in the match passing the record for most points scored for the club in a season by a player, passing Matthew Ridge's record of 255, with Garrick having scored 258 points at the end of the round. 

Manly continued their winning performances against the Canberra Raiders, winning 19-18.

In Round 24, the clubs 36-18 win over the Canterbury-Bankstown Bulldogs propelled them into the top four and ensured that Tom Trbojevic would win the prestigious Dally M Medal for player of the year. 

Round 25, the club beat the Cowboys 46-18 in a strong second half performance. Reuben Garrick (304) also passed Hazem El Masri's (288) record for most points in a regular season. The game also saw a collective effort from Reuben Garrick, Daly Cherry-Evans and Tom Trbojevic to score the try of the year.

Finals 
Manly started off with a poor performance to begin the finals, losing to the Melbourne Storm 40-12 at Sunshine Coast Stadium forcing them into a second chance semi due to them finishing in the top four. 

Manly produced a 42-6 win against the Sydney Roosters advancing them to the preliminary finals.

On the lead up to their preliminary final match against the South Sydney Rabbitohs, many people, especially former Penrith player Ryan Girdler criticised Manly for making the top four but not beating any side that finished in the top four labelling them as 'flat track bullies' stating that they don't deserve to be 80 minutes away from a grand final.  Manly went on to lose the match 36-16, with Tom Trbojevic breaking Phil Blake's record (27) for most tries in a season for the club scoring 28. Putting an end to a successful season. 

Tom Trbojevic finished the season as top try scorer for the club scoring 28 and Reuben Garrick finishing as top point scorer with 334.

Results

Pre-season 
Source:

Regular season 
Source:

Finals Series 

*Game relocated due to border restrictions between Australia and New Zealand

**Game relocated due to the new COVID-19 outbreak in Sydney

Games in italics are unlikely to be where they are currently scheduled.

Records/honours 
In Round 22, Reuben Garrick beat Matthew Ridge's record for most points scored in a season for the club with the Ridge's record being 255. Garrick now sits at 268 points with another three weeks remaining in the regular season and then the finals series
In Round 25 Garrick beat the all time points record in a regular season passing Hazem El Masri's record of 288 with 304 points
That also means that Garrick was the first player to score more than 300 points in a regular season
In the Preliminary Finals, Tom Trbojevic broke the clubs record for most tries in a season by an individual player scoring 28 tries passing Phil Blake's record of 27 tries in the 1983 season

Club awards 
Source:

 Roy Bull Best And Fairest: Tom Trbojevic
 NRL Players' Player: Tom Trbojevic
 Most Tries: Tom Trbojevic
 Gordon Willoughby Medalion (Best player voted by Members): Tom Trbojevic
 Most Points: Reuben Garrick
 Ken Arthurson Rising Star Award: Josh Schuster and Jason Saab
 Steve Menzies Play Of The Year Award: Reuben Garrick
 Doug Daley Clubman Of The Year: Toafofoa Sipley
 NRL Club Community Award: Sean Keppie

Dally M Awards for Manly players 
Source:

 Dally M Player Of The Year: Tom Trbojevic
 Fullback Of The Year: Tom Trbojevic
 Winger Of The Year: Reuben Garrick 
 Top Point Scorer: Reuben Garrick
 Try Of The Year: Tom Trbojevic

References 

Manly Warringah Sea Eagles seasons
Manly Warringah Sea Eagles season